Dominique de Legge (born 18 February 1952) is a French politician and a member of the Senate of France. He represents the Ille-et-Vilaine department and is a member of the Union for a Popular Movement Party.

Ahead of the 2022 presidential elections, De Legge publicly declared his support for Michel Barnier as the Republicans’ candidate.

References

Page on the Senate website

1952 births
Living people
People from Ille-et-Vilaine
Union for a Popular Movement politicians
Gaullism, a way forward for France
French Senators of the Fifth Republic
Senators of Ille-et-Vilaine
Mayors of places in Brittany
The Republicans (France) politicians